Aislinn Connolly is a camogie player who was an All Star winner in 2010 and 2011 and a member of the Team of the Championship for 2011. She played in the All Ireland finals of 2010 and 2011.

Family background
She is the daughter of John Connolly, who featured in Galway’s breakthrough All Ireland victory of 1980.

Career
She exploded on to the sporting scene in Galway’s All Ireland minor championship success of 2000. Having played as a sub in Galway’s narrowly unsuccessful team of 1999s she won player of the match as Galway beat Cork by 2-9 to 0-3 in Tullamore. She played on the University of Limerick team that won three Ashbourne Cup titles in a row in 2004, 2005, and 2006 She was nominated for an All Star award in 2009.

References

Year of birth missing (living people)
Living people
Galway camogie players
UL GAA camogie players